Astragalus casei is a species of milkvetch known by the common name Case's milkvetch. It is native to the Mojave Desert and its sky island woodlands of eastern California and western Nevada.

Description
The plant bears an inflorescence of up to 25 pink, lilac, or white flowers.

It is narrow, slightly hairy, and tipped with a sharp beak. It is pulpy when new and it dries to a tough texture.

External links
Jepson Manual Treatment - Astragalus casei
USDA Plants Profile
Astragalus casei - Photo gallery

casei
Flora of Nevada
Flora of the California desert regions
Flora without expected TNC conservation status